Burkina Faso is a landlocked country in West Africa. Its natural vegetation mainly consists of savannas. In the south, there are also dry forests and gallery forests. The highest diversity of plant species can be found in the humid southwest.

Species
Abelmoschus esculentus (L.) Moench
Abelmoschus moschatus Medik.
Abildgaardia ovata (Burm.f.) Kral
Abrus canescens Welw. ex Baker
Abrus melanospermus Hassk.
Abrus precatorius 
Abutilon fruticosum Guill. & Perr.
Abutilon grandifolium (Willd.) Sweet
Abutilon indicum (L.) Sweet
Abutilon pannosum (G.Forst.) Schltdl.
Abutilon ramosum (Cav.) Guill. & Perr.
Acacia amythethophylla Steud. ex A.Rich.
Acacia dudgeoni Holland
Acacia erythrocalyx Brenan
Acacia hockii De Wild.
Acacia holosericea A.Cunn. ex G.Don
Acalypha ceraceopunctata Pax
Acalypha ciliata Forssk.
Acalypha crenata Hochst. ex A.Rich.
Acalypha hispida Burm.f.
Acalypha segetalis Müll.Arg.
Acanthospermum hispidum DC.
Achyranthes aspera 
Acmella caulirhiza Delile
Acmella uliginosa (Sw.) Cass.
Acridocarpus chevalieri Sprague
Acroceras amplectens Stapf
Acroceras zizanioides (Kunth) Dandy
Adansonia digitata 
Adenanthera pavonina 
Adenia cissampeloides (Planch. ex Hook.) Harms
Adenia lobata (Jacq.) Engl.
 Adenodolichos paniculatus (Hua) Hutch. & Dalziel
 Adenostemma caffrum DC.
 Adenostemma viscosum J.R.Forst. & G.Forst.
 Adiantum philippense 
 Adiantum schweinfurthii Kuhn
 Aedesia glabra (Klatt) O.Hoffm.
 Aeollanthus pubescens Benth.
 Aerva javanica (Burm.f.) Juss. ex Schult.
 Aerva lanata (L.) Juss. ex Schult.
 Aeschynomene afraspera J.Léonard
 Aeschynomene crassicaulis Harms
 Aeschynomene indica 
 Aeschynomene schimperi A.Rich.
 Aeschynomene sensitiva Sw.
 Aeschynomene tambacoundensis Berhaut
 Afraegle paniculata (Schumach.) Engl.
 Aframomum alboviolaceum (Ridl.) K.Schum.
 Aframomum sceptrum (Oliv. & D.Hanb.) K.Schum.
 Afrotrilepis pilosa (Boeckeler) J.Raynal
 Afzelia africana Sm. ex Pers.
 Agave sisalana Perrine
 Agelanthus dodoneifolius (DC.) Polhill & Wiens
 Ageratum conyzoides 
 Akeassia grangeoides J.-P.Lebrun & Stork.
 Alafia landolphioides (Thonn.) De Wild.
 Albizia chevalieri Harms
 Albizia dinklagei (Harms) Harms
 Albizia ferruginea (Guill. & Perr.) Benth.
 Albizia lebbeck (L.) Benth.
 Albizia malacophylla (A.Rich.) Walp.
 Albizia zygia (DC.) J.F.Macbr.
 Albuca nigritana (Baker) Troupin
 Alchornea cordifolia (Schumach. & Thonn.) Müll.Arg.
 Alectra vogelii Benth.
 Allamanda cathartica 
 Allium cepa 
 Allium sativum 
 Allophylus africanus P.Beauv.
 Allophylus spicatus (Poir.) Radlk.
 Alloteropsis semialata (R.Br.) Hitchc.
 Aloe buettneri A.Berger
 Aloe macrocarpa Tod.
 Aloe schweinfurthii Baker
 Alstonia congensis Engl.
 Alternanthera nodiflora R.Br.
 Alternanthera pungens Kunth
 Alternanthera sessilis (L.) DC.
 Alysicarpus glumaceus (Vahl) DC.
 Alysicarpus ovalifolius (Schumach.) J.Léonard
 Alysicarpus rugosus (Willd.) DC.
 Alysicarpus zeyheri Harv.
 Amaranthus dubius Mart. ex Thell.
 Amaranthus graecizans 
 Amaranthus hybridus 
 Amaranthus spinosus 
 Amaranthus viridis 
 Amblygonocarpus andongensis (Welw. ex Oliv.) Exell & Torre
 Ambrosia maritima 
 Ammannia auriculata Willd.
 Ammannia baccifera 
 Ammannia gracilis Guill. & Perr.
 Ammannia prieuriana Guill. & Perr.
 Ammannia senegalensis Lam.
 Amorphophallus abyssinicus (A.Rich.) N.E.Br.
 Amorphophallus aphyllus (Hook.) Hutch.
 Amorphophallus baumannii (Engl.) N.E.Br.
 Amorphophallus dracontioides (Engl.) N.E.Br.
 Amorphophallus johnsonii N.E.Br.
 Ampelocissus africana (Lour.) Merr.
 Ampelocissus leonensis (Hook.f.) Planch.
 Ampelocissus multistriata (Baker) Planch.
 Anacardium occidentale 
 Anadelphia afzeliana (Rendle) Stapf
 Anadelphia leptocoma (Trin.) Pilg.
 Anadelphia trispiculata Stapf
 Anagallis pumila Sw.
 Ananas comosus (L.) Merr.
 Anchomanes difformis (Blume) Engl.
 Ancylobotrys amoena Hua
 Andira inermis (W.Wright) DC.
 Andropogon africanus Franch.
 Andropogon canaliculatus Schumach.
 Andropogon chevalieri Reznik.
 Andropogon chinensis (Nees) Merr.
 Andropogon gayanus Kunth
 Andropogon macrophyllus Stapf
 Andropogon perligulatus Stapf
 Andropogon pinguipes Stapf
 Andropogon pseudapricus Stapf
 Andropogon pteropholis Clayton
 Andropogon schirensis A.Rich.
 Andropogon tectorum Schumach. & Thonn.
 Aneilema lanceolatum Benth.
 Aneilema paludosum A.Chev.
 Aneilema setiferum A.Chev.
 Aneilema umbrosum (Vahl) Kunth
 Annona glauca Schumach. & Thonn.
 Annona muricata 
 Annona senegalensis Pers.
 Annona squamosa 
 Anogeissus leiocarpa (DC.) Guill. & Perr.
 Anosporum pectinatus (Vahl) Lye
 Antherotoma irvingiana (Hook.f.) Jacq.-Fél.
 Antherotoma phaeotricha (Hochst.) Jacq.-Fél.
 Antherotoma senegambiensis (Guill. & Perr.) Jacq.-Fél.
 Anthocleista djalonensis A.Chev.
 Anthocleista procera Lepr. ex A.Chev.
 Anthostema senegalense A.Juss.
 Antiaris toxicaria Lesch.
 Anticharis senegalensis (Walp.) Bhandari
 Antidesma rufescens Tul.
 Antidesma venosum E.Mey. ex Tul.
 Apodostigma pallens (Planch. ex Oliv.) R.Wilczek
 Aponogeton subconjugatus Schumach. & Thonn.
 Arachis hypogaea 
 Argemone mexicana 
 Argyreia nervosa (Burm.f.) Bojer
 Aristida adscensionis 
 Aristida funiculata Trin. & Rupr.
 Aristida hordeacea Kunth
 Aristida kerstingii Pilg.
 Aristida mutabilis Trin. & Rupr.
 Aristida rhiniochloa Hochst.
 Aristida sieberiana Trin.
 Aristida stipoides Lam.
 Aristolochia albida Duch.
 Asclepias curassavica 
 Ascolepis brasiliensis (Kunth) Benth.
 Ascolepis capensis (Kunth) Ridl.
 Ascolepis dipsacoides (Schumach.) J.Raynal
 Ascolepis protea Welw.
 Asparagus africanus Lam.
 Asparagus flagellaris (Kunth) Baker
 Asparagus schroederi Engl.
 Aspidoglossum interruptum (E.Mey.) Bullock
 Aspilia africana (Pers.) C.D.Adams
 Aspilia angustifolia Oliv. & Hiern
 Aspilia bussei O.Hoffm. & Muschl.
 Aspilia ciliata (Schumach.) Wild
 Aspilia helianthoides (Schumach. & Thonn.) Oliv. & Hiern
 Aspilia kotschyi (Sch.Bip.) Oliv.
 Aspilia paludosa Berhaut
 Aspilia rudis Oliv. & Hiern
 Astraea lobata (L.) Klotzsch
 Asystasia gangetica (L.) T.Anderson
 Averrhoa carambola 
 Azadirachta indica A.Juss.
 Azolla africana Desv.
 Bacopa crenata (P.Beauv.) Hepper
 Bacopa decumbens (Fernald) F.N.Williams
 Bacopa floribunda (R.Br.) Wettst.
 Bacopa hamiltoniana (Benth.) Wettst.
 Bacopa occultans (Hiern) Hutch. & Dalziel
 Baissea multiflora A.DC.
 Bakerophyton lateritium (Harms) Hutch. ex Maheshw.
 Bakerophyton pulchellum (Planch. ex Baker) Maheshw.
 Balanites aegyptiaca (L.) Delile
 Bambusa vulgaris Schrad. ex J.C.Wendl.
 Barleria lupulina Lindl.
 Barleria ruellioides T.Anderson
 Basella alba L.
 Basilicum polystachyon (L.) Moench
 Batopedina tenuis (A.Chev. ex Hutch. & Dalziel) Verdc.
 Bauhinia monandra Kurz
 Bauhinia purpurea L.
 Bauhinia rufescens Lam.
 Becium obovatum (E.Mey. ex Benth.) N.E.Br.
 Bergia ammannioides Roxb. ex Roth
 Bergia capensis L.
 Bergia suffruticosa (Delile) Fenzl
 Berlinia grandiflora (Vahl) Hutch. & Dalziel
 Bidens barteri (Oliv. & Hiern) T.G.J.Rayner
 Bidens bipinnata L.
 Bidens biternata (Lour.) Merr. & Sherff
 Bidens borianiana (Sch.Bip. ex Schweinf. & Asch.) Cufod.
 Bidens engleri O.E.Schulz
 Bidens pilosa L.
 Biophytum umbraculum Welw.
 Bixa orellana L.
 Blainvillea acmella (L.) Philipson
 Blainvillea gayana Cass.
 Blepharis linariifolia Pers.
 Blepharis maderaspatensis (L.) B.Heyne ex Roth
 Blighia sapida K.D.Koenig
 Blumea adamsii J.-P.Lebrun & Stork
 Blumea axillaris (Lam.) DC.
 Blumea crispata (Vahl) Merxm.
 Blumea heudelotii (C.D.Adams) Lisowski
 Blumea oloptera DC.
 Bobgunnia madagascariensis (Desv.) J.H.Kirkbr. & Wiersema
 Boerhavia coccinea Mill.
 Boerhavia diffusa L.
 Boerhavia erecta L.
 Boerhavia repens L.
 Bolbitis heudelotii (Fee) Alston
 Bombax costatum Pellegr. & Vuill.
 Borassus aethiopum Mart.
 Borassus akeassii Bayton, Ouédr. & Guinko
 Borreria ocymoides (Burm.f.) DC.
 Boscia angustifolia A.Rich.
 Boscia salicifolia Oliv.
 Boscia senegalensis (Pers.) Lam.
 Boswellia dalzielii Hutch.
 Bothriochloa bladhii (Retz.) S.T.Blake
 Bougainvillea glabra Choisy
 Bougainvillea spectabilis Willd.
 Brachiaria deflexa (Schumach.) C.E.Hubb. ex Robyns
 Brachiaria lata (Schumach.) C.E.Hubb.
 Brachiaria mutica (Forssk.) Stapf
 Brachiaria orthostachys (Mez) Clayton
 Brachiaria plantaginea (Link) Hitchc.
 Brachiaria ramosa (L.) Stapf
 Brachiaria serrata (Thunb.) Stapf
 Brachiaria stigmatisata (Mez) Stapf
 Brachiaria villosa (Lam.) A.Camus
 Brachiaria xantholeuca (Hack.) Stapf
 Brachyachne obtusiflora (Benth.) C.E.Hubb.
 Brachycorythis macrantha (Lindl.) Summerh.
 Brachycorythis pubescens Harv.
 Brachystelma medusanthemum J.-P.Lebrun & Stork
 Brachystelma simplex Schltr.
 Brassica oleracea L.
 Breonadia salicina (Vahl) Hepper & J.R.I.Wood
 Bridelia ferruginea Benth.
 Bridelia micrantha (Hochst.) Baill.
 Bridelia scleroneura Müll.Arg.
 Bridelia speciosa Müll.Arg.
 Buchnera bowalensis A.Chev.
 Buchnera capitata Benth.
 Buchnera hispida Buch.-Ham. ex D.Don
 Buchnera leptostachya Benth.
 Bulbostylis abortiva (Steud.) C.B.Clarke
 Bulbostylis barbata (Rottb.) C.B.Clarke
 Bulbostylis boeckeleriana (Schweinf.) Beetle
 Bulbostylis cioniana (Savi) Lye
 Bulbostylis coleotricha (Hochst. ex A.Rich.) C.B.Clarke
 Bulbostylis densa (Wall.) Hand.-Mazz.
 Bulbostylis filamentosa (Vahl) C.B.Clarke
 Bulbostylis fimbristyloides C.B.Clarke
 Bulbostylis hispidula (Vahl) R.W.Haines
 Bulbostylis pilosa (Willd.) Cherm.
 Bulbostylis pusilla (Hochst. ex A.Rich.) C.B.Clarke
 Bulbostylis scabricaulis Cherm.
 Bulbostylis viridecarinata (De Wild.) Goetgh.
 Burkea africana Hook.
 Burnatia enneandra Micheli
 Butomopsis latifolia (D.Don) Kunth
 Byrsanthus brownii Guill.
 Cadaba farinosa Forssk.
 Cadaba glandulosa Forssk.
 Caesalpinia pulcherrima (L.) Sw.
 Cajanus cajan (L.) Millsp.
 Cajanus kerstingii Harms
 Caladium bicolor (Aiton) Vent.
 Calamus deerratus G.Mann & H.Wendl.
 Caldesia reniformis (D.Don) Makino
 Calopogonium mucunoides Desv.
 Calotropis procera (Aiton) R.Br.
 Calyptrochilum christyanum (Rchb.f.) Summerh.
 Calyptrochilum emarginatum (Sw.) Schltr.
 Campylospermum flavum (Schumach. & Thonn.) Farron
 Campylospermum glaberrimum (P.Beauv.) Farron
 Campylospermum squamosum (DC.) Farron
 Canarium schweinfurthii Engl.
 Canavalia africana Dunn
 Canavalia ensiformis (L.) DC.
 Canscora decussata (Roxb.) Roem. & Schult.
 Canscora diffusa (Vahl) R.Br. ex Roem. & Schult.
 Caperonia serrata (Turcz.) C.Presl
 Capparis erythrocarpos Isert
 Capparis fascicularis DC.
 Capparis sepiaria L.
 Capparis tomentosa Lam.
 Capsicum annuum L.
 Capsicum chinense Jacq.
 Capsicum frutescens L.
 Caralluma adscendens (Roxb.) Haw.
 Carapa procera DC.
 Cardiospermum halicacabum L.
 Carica papaya L.
 Carissa spinarum (Forssk.) Vahl
 Caryota mitis Lour.
 Cascabela thevetia (L.) Lippold
 Cassia sieberiana DC.
 Cassipourea congoensis DC.
 Cassytha filiformis L.
 Casuarina equisetifolia L.
 Catharanthus roseus (L.) G.Don
 Cayratia debilis (Baker) Suess.
 Cayratia delicatula (Willems) Desc.
 Cayratia gracilis (Guill. & Perr.) Suess.
 Ceiba pentandra (L.) Gaertn.
 Celosia argentea L.
 Celosia trigyna L.
 Celtis toka (Forssk.) Hepper & J.R.I.Wood
 Cenchrus biflorus Roxb.
 Cenchrus ciliaris L.
 Cenchrus prieurii (Kunth) Maire
 Cenchrus purpureus (Schumach.) Morrone
 Centaurea praecox Oliv. & Hiern
 Centaurea senegalensis DC.
 Centella asiatica (L.) Urb.
 Centrosema pubescens Benth.
 Centrostachys aquatica (R.Br.) Wall.
 Ceratophyllum demersum L.
 Ceratopteris cornuta (P.Beauv.) Lepr.
 Ceratotheca sesamoides Endl.
 Ceropegia campanulata G.Don
 Ceropegia deightonii Hutch. & Dalziel
 Ceropegia fusiformis N.E.Br.
 Ceropegia nilotica Kotschy
 Ceropegia racemosa N.E.Br.
 Ceropegia rhynchantha Schltr.
 Ceropegia sankuruensis Schltr.
 Ceruana pratensis Forssk.
 Chamaecrista absus L.
 Chamaecrista kirkii (Oliv.)
 Chamaecrista nigricans (Vahl)
 Chamaecrista pratensis (R.Vig.) Du Puy
 Chascanum laetum Walp.
 Chasmanthera dependens Hochst.
 Chasmopodium caudatum (Hack.) Stapf
 Chionanthus niloticus (Oliv.) Stearn
 Chloris barbata Sw.
 Chloris pilosa Schumach.
 Chloris robusta Stapf
 Chloris virgata Sw.
 Chlorophytum blepharophyllum Schweinf. ex Baker
 Chlorophytum caulescens (Baker) Marais & Reilly
 Chlorophytum gallabatense Schweinf. ex Baker
 Chlorophytum geophilum Peter ex Poelln.
 Chlorophytum lancifolium Baker
 Chlorophytum laxum R.Br.
 Chlorophytum limosum (Baker) Nordal
 Chlorophytum macrophyllum (A.Rich.) Asch.
 Chlorophytum nzii A.Chev. ex Hepper
 Chlorophytum orchidastrum Lindl.
 Chlorophytum polystachys Baker
 Chlorophytum pusillum Schweinf. ex Baker
 Chlorophytum senegalense (Baker) Hepper
 Chlorophytum stenopetalum Baker
 Christiana africana DC.
 Chrozophora brocchiana (Vis.) Schweinf.
 Chrozophora plicata (Vahl) A.Juss. ex Spreng.
 Chrozophora senegalensis (Lam.) A.Juss. ex Spreng.
 Chrysanthellum indicum DC.
 Chrysochloa hindsii C.E.Hubb.
 Chrysopogon aciculatus (Retz.) Trin.
 Chrysopogon nigritanus (Benth.) Veldkamp
 Cienfuegosia digitata Cav.
 Cienfuegosia heteroclada Sprague
 Cissampelos mucronata A.Rich.
 Cissus aralioides (Baker) Planch.
 Cissus arguta Hook.f.
 Cissus cornifolia (Baker) Planch.
 Cissus corylifolia (Baker) Planch.
 Cissus diffusiflora (Baker) Planch.
 Cissus doeringii Gilg & M.Brandt
 Cissus palmatifida (Baker) Planch.
 Cissus petiolata Hook.f.
 Cissus polyantha Gilg & M.Brandt
 Cissus populnea Guill. & Perr.
 Cissus producta Afzel.
 Cissus quadrangularis L.
 Cissus rubiginosa (Welw. ex Baker) Planch.
 Cissus rufescens Guill. & Perr.
 Citrullus colocynthis (L.) Schrad.
 Citrullus lanatus (Thunb.) Matsum. & Nakai
 Citrus aurantium L.
 Citrus limon (L.) Burm.f.
 Citrus reticulata Blanco
 Clappertonia ficifolia (Willd.) Decne.
 Cleistopholis patens (Benth.) Engl. & Diels
 Clematis hirsuta Guill. & Perr.
 Cleome gynandra L.
 Cleome monophylla L.
 Cleome polyanthera Schweinf. & Gilg
 Cleome scaposa DC.
 Cleome tenella L.
 Cleome viscosa L.
 Clerodendrum capitatum (Willd.) Schumach.
 Clerodendrum polycephalum Baker
 Clerodendrum thyrsoideum Gürke
 Clitoria ternatea L.
 Cochlospermum planchonii Hook.f.
 Cochlospermum tinctorium Perr. ex A.Rich.
 Cocos nucifera L.
 Codiaeum variegatum (L.) A.Juss.
 Coelorachis afraurita (Stapf) Stapf
 Coffea ebracteolata (Hiern) Brenan
 Cola cordifolia (Cav.) R.Br.
 Cola gigantea A.Chev.
 Cola laurifolia Mast.
 Cola nitida (Vent.) Schott & Endl.
 Coldenia procumbens L.
 Colocasia esculenta (L.) Schott
 Combretum aculeatum Vent.
 Combretum acutum M.A.Lawson
 Combretum adenogonium Steud. ex A.Rich.
 Combretum collinum Fresen.
 Combretum glutinosum Perr. ex DC.
 Combretum indicum (L.) Jongkind
 Combretum lecardii Engl. & Diels
 Combretum micranthum G.Don
 Combretum molle R.Br. ex G.Don
 Combretum nigricans Lepr. ex Guill. & Perr.
 Combretum nioroense Aubrév. ex Keay
 Combretum paniculatum Vent.
 Combretum racemosum P.Beauv.
 Combretum sericeum G.Don
 Combretum tomentosum G.Don
 Commelina africana L.
 Commelina aspera Benth.
 Commelina benghalensis L.
 Commelina bracteosa Hassk.
 Commelina diffusa Burm.f.
 Commelina erecta L.
 Commelina forsskaolii Vahl
 Commelina lagosensis C.B.Clarke
 Commelina nigritana Benth.
 Commelina subulata Roth
 Commicarpus helenae (Schult.) Meikle
 Commiphora africana (A.Rich.) Engl.
 Commiphora pedunculata (Kotschy & Peyr.) Engl.
 Convolvulus prostratus Forssk.
 Corallocarpus epigaeus (Rottler) C.B.Clarke
 Corchorus aestuans L.
 Corchorus fascicularis Lam.
 Corchorus olitorius L.
 Corchorus tridens L.
 Corchorus trilocularis L.
 Cordia myxa L.
 Cordia sebestena L.
 Cordia sinensis Lam.
 Cordyla pinnata (Lepr. ex A.Rich.) Milne-Redh.
 Costus afer Ker Gawl.
 Costus lucanusianus J.Braun & K.Schum.
 Costus spectabilis (Fenzl) K.Schum.
 Craterostigma plantagineum Hochst.
 Crateva adansonii DC.
 Cremaspora triflora (Thonn.) K.Schum.
 Crepidorhopalon debilis (Skan) Eb.Fisch.
 Crepidorhopalon spicatus (Engl.) Eb.Fisch.
 Crescentia cujete L.
 Crinum distichum Herb.
 Crinum nubicum Hannibal
 Crinum ornatum (L.f. ex Aiton) Bury
 Crossopteryx febrifuga (Afzel. ex G.Don) Benth.
 Crotalaria arenaria Benth.
 Crotalaria atrorubens Hochst. ex Benth.
 Crotalaria barkae Schweinf.
 Crotalaria bongensis Baker f.
 Crotalaria calycina Schrank
 Crotalaria cephalotes Steud. ex A.Rich.
 Crotalaria cleomifolia Welw. ex Baker
 Crotalaria comosa Baker
 Crotalaria confusa Hepper
 Crotalaria cylindrocarpa DC.
 Crotalaria deightonii Hepper
 Crotalaria ebenoides (Guill. & Perr.) Walp.
 Crotalaria glauca Willd.
 Crotalaria goreensis Guill. & Perr.
 Crotalaria graminicola Taub. ex Baker f.
 Crotalaria hyssopifolia Klotzsch
 Crotalaria juncea L.
 Crotalaria lachnosema Stapf
 Crotalaria lathyroides Guill. & Perr.
 Crotalaria leprieurii Guill. & Perr.
 Crotalaria macrocalyx Benth.
 Crotalaria microcarpa Hochst. ex Benth.
 Crotalaria naragutensis Hutch.
 Crotalaria ochroleuca G.Don
 Crotalaria ononoides Benth.
 Crotalaria pallida Aiton
 Crotalaria perrottetii DC.
 Crotalaria podocarpa DC.
 Crotalaria pseudotenuirama Torre
 Crotalaria retusa L.
 Crotalaria senegalensis (Pers.) Bacle ex DC.
 Crotalaria trichotoma Bojer
 Croton gratissimus Burch.
 Croton hirtus L'Hér.
 Croton nigritanus Scott-Elliot
 Croton pseudopulchellus Pax
 Croton scarciesii Scott-Elliot
 Cryptolepis oblongifolia (Meisn.) Schltr.
 Cryptolepis sanguinolenta (Lindl.) Schltr.
 Cryptostegia grandiflora R.Br. ex Lindl.
 Ctenium canescens Benth.
 Ctenium elegans Kunth
 Ctenium newtonii Hack.
 Ctenium villosum Berhaut
 Ctenolepis cerasiformis (Stocks) Hook.f.
 Cucumis anguria L.
 Cucumis maderaspatanus L.
 Cucumis melo L.
 Cucumis metuliferus E.Mey. ex Naudin
 Cucumis prophetarum L.
 Cucumis sativus L.
 Cucurbita pepo L.
 Culcasia saxatilis A.Chev.
 Curculigo pilosa (Schumach. & Thonn.) Engl.
 Cuscuta australis R.Br.
 Cuscuta campestris Yunck.
 Cussonia arborea Hochst. ex A.Rich.
 Cyamopsis senegalensis Guill. & Perr.
 Cyanotis angusta C.B.Clarke
 Cyanotis caespitosa Kotschy & Peyr.
 Cyanotis lanata Benth.
 Cyanotis longifolia Benth.
 Cyanthillium cinereum (L.) H.Rob. (Vernonia cinerea)
 Cyathula achyranthoides (Kunth) Moq.
 Cyathula prostrata (L.) Blume
 Cycas revoluta Thunb.
 Cyclocarpa stellaris Afzel. ex Baker
 Cycnium tubulosum (L.f.) Engl.
 Cymbopogon caesius (Nees ex Hook. & Arn.) Stapf
 Cymbopogon schoenanthus (L.) Spreng.
 Cynanchum hastifolium K.Schum.
 Cynodon dactylon (L.) Pers.
 Cyperus alopecuroides Rottb.
 Cyperus amabilis Vahl
 Cyperus articulatus L.
 Cyperus compressus L.
 Cyperus conglomeratus Rottb.
 Cyperus cuspidatus Kunth
 Cyperus denudatus L.f.
 Cyperus difformis 
 Cyperus digitatus Roxb.
 Cyperus dilatatus Schumach. & Thonn.
 Cyperus distans L.f.
 Cyperus dives Delile
 Cyperus esculentus 
 Cyperus exaltatus Retz.
 Cyperus haspan 
 Cyperus imbricatus Retz.
 Cyperus incompressus C.B.Clarke
 Cyperus iria 
 Cyperus jeminicus Rottb.
 Cyperus karlschumannii C.B.Clarke
 Cyperus longus 
 Cyperus maculatus Boeckeler
 Cyperus margaritaceus Vahl
 Cyperus niveus Retz.
 Cyperus podocarpus Boeckeler
 Cyperus procerus Rottb.
 Cyperus pulchellus R.Br.
 Cyperus pustulatus Vahl
 Cyperus reduncus Hochst. ex Boeckeler
 Cyperus remotispicatus S.S.Hooper
 Cyperus rotundus 
 Cyperus sphacelatus Rottb.
 Cyperus submicrolepis Kük.
 Cyperus tenuiculmis Boeckeler
 Cyperus tenuispica Steud.
 Cyperus zollingeri Steud.
 Cyphostemma adenocaule (Steud. ex A.Rich.) Desc. ex Wild & R.B.Drumm.
 Cyphostemma crotalarioides (Planch.) Desc. ex Wild & R.B.Drumm.
 Cyphostemma cymosum (Schumach. & Thonn.) Desc.
 Cyphostemma flavicans (Baker) Desc.
 Cyphostemma junceum (Webb) Wild & R.B.Drumm.
 Cyphostemma lageniflorum (Gilg & M.Brandt) Desc.
 Cyphostemma sokodense (Gilg & M.Brandt) Desc.
 Cyphostemma vogelii (Hook.f.) Desc.
 Cyphostemma waterlotii (A.Chev.) Desc.
 Dactyloctenium aegyptium (L.) Willd.
 Dalbergia bignonae Berhaut
 Dalbergia hostilis Benth.
 Dalbergia melanoxylon Guill. & Perr.
 Dalbergia saxatilis Hook.f.
 Dalbergia sissoo Roxb. ex. DC.
 Dalechampia scandens 
 Daniellia oliveri (Rolfe) Hutch. & Dalziel
 Datura innoxia Mill.
 Delonix regia (Bojer ex Hook.) Raf.
 Desmidorchis acutangula Decne.
 Desmodium adscendens (Sw.) DC.
 Desmodium barbatum (L.) Benth.
 Desmodium gangeticum (L.) DC.
 Desmodium hirtum Guill. & Perr.
 Desmodium laxiflorum DC.
 Desmodium linearifolium G.Don
 Desmodium ospriostreblum Chiov.
 Desmodium salicifolium (Poir.) DC.
 Desmodium setigerum (E.Mey.) Benth. ex Harv.
 Desmodium tortuosum (Sw.) DC.
 Desmodium velutinum (Willd.) DC.
 Detarium microcarpum Guill. & Perr.
 Detarium senegalense J.F.Gmel.
 Dialium guineense Willd.
 Dichrostachys cinerea (L.) Wight & Arn.
 Dicliptera paniculata (Forssk.) I.Darbysh.
 Dicliptera verticillata (Forssk.) C.Chr.
 Dicoma tomentosa Cass.
 Diectomis fastigiata Sw.
 Digitaria argillacea (Hitchc. & Chase) Fernald
 Digitaria ciliaris (Retz.) Koeler
 Digitaria debilis (Desf.) Willd.
 Digitaria delicata Goetgh.
 Digitaria delicatula Stapf
 Digitaria diagonalis (Nees) Stapf
 Digitaria exilis (Kippist) Stapf
 Digitaria gayana (Kunth) A.Chev. ex Stapf
 Digitaria horizontalis Willd.
 Digitaria leptorhachis (Pilg.) Stapf
 Digitaria longiflora (Retz.) Pers.
 Digitaria ternata (A.Rich.) Stapf
 Digitaria velutina (Forssk.) P.Beauv.
 Diheteropogon amplectens (Nees) Clayton
 Diheteropogon hagerupii Hitchc.
 Dinebra retroflexa (Vahl) Panz.
 Dioscorea abyssinica Hochst. ex Kunth
 Dioscorea alata 
 Dioscorea bulbifera 
 Dioscorea cayenensis Lam.
 Dioscorea dumetorum (Kunth) Pax
 Dioscorea esculenta (Lour.) Burkill
 Dioscorea hirtiflora Benth.
 Dioscorea minutiflora Engl.
 Dioscorea praehensilis Benth.
 Dioscorea quartiniana A.Rich.
 Dioscorea sagittifolia Pax
 Dioscorea schimperiana Hochst. ex Kunth
 Dioscorea smilacifolia De Wild.
 Dioscorea togoensis R.Knuth
 Diospyros abyssinica (Hiern) F.White
 Diospyros elliotii (Hiern) F.White
 Diospyros ferrea (Willd.) Bakh.
 Diospyros mespiliformis Hochst. ex A.DC.
 Dipcadi longifolium (Lindl.) Baker
 Diplacrum africanum (Benth.) C.B.Clarke
 Dissomeria crenata Hook.f. ex Benth.
 Dissotis thollonii Cogn. ex Büttner
 Dodonaea viscosa Jacq.
 Dombeya buettneri K.Schum.
 Dombeya quinqueseta (Delile) Exell
 Dopatrium junceum (Roxb.) Buch.-Ham. ex Benth.
 Dopatrium longidens Skan
 Dopatrium macranthum Oliv.
 Dopatrium senegalense Benth.
 Dorstenia cuspidata Hochst. ex A.Rich.
 Doryopteris kirkii (Hook.) Alston
 Dregea abyssinica (Hochst.) K.Schum.
 Drimia altissima (L.f.) Ker Gawl.
 Drimia indica (Roxb.) Jessop
 Drosera indica 
 Drypetes floribunda (Müll.Arg.) Hutch.
 Duranta erecta 
 Dyschoriste heudelotiana (Nees) Kuntze
 Dyschoriste nagchana (Nees) Bennet
 Echinochloa callopus (Pilg.) Clayton
 Echinochloa colona (L.) Link
 Echinochloa crus-galli (L.) P.Beauv.
 Echinochloa pyramidalis (Lam.) Hitchc. & Chase
 Echinochloa stagnina (Retz.) P.Beauv.
 Echinops longifolius A.Rich.
 Eclipta prostrata (L.) L.
 Eichhornia crassipes (Mart.) Solms
 Eichhornia natans (P.Beauv.) Solms
 Ekebergia capensis Sparrm.
 Elaeis guineensis Jacq.
 Eleocharis acutangula (Roxb.) Schult.
 Eleocharis atropurpurea (Retz.) C.Presl
 Eleocharis complanata Boeckeler
 Eleocharis dulcis (Burm.f.) Trin. ex Hensch.
 Eleocharis geniculata (L.) Roem. & Schult.
 Eleocharis mutata (L.) Roem. & Schult.
 Eleocharis setifolia (A.Rich.) J.Raynal
 Eleocharis variegata (Poir.) C.Presl
 Elephantopus mollis Kunth
 Elephantopus senegalensis (Klatt) Oliv. & Hiern
 Eleusine coracana (L.) Gaertn.
 Eleusine indica (L.) Gaertn.
 Eleutheranthera ruderalis (Sw.) Sch.Bip.
 Elionurus ciliaris Kunth
 Elionurus elegans Kunth
 Elionurus euchaetus Adjan. & Clayton
 Elionurus hirtifolius Hack.
 Elionurus muticus (Spreng.) Kuntze
 Elymandra androphila (Stapf) Stapf
 Elymandra gossweileri (Stapf) Clayton
 Elytraria marginata Vahl
 Elytrophorus spicatus (Willd.) A.Camus
 Embelia guineensis Baker
 Embelia rowlandii Gilg
 Endostemon tereticaulis (Poir.) M.Ashby
 Englerastrum schweinfurthii Briq.
 Englerina lecardii (Engl.) Balle
 Entada abyssinica Steud. ex A.Rich.
 Entada africana Guill. & Perr.
 Entada wahlbergii Harv.
 Enteropogon prieurii (Kunth) Clayton
 Enteropogon rupestris (J.A.Schmidt) A.Chev.
 Enydra fluctuans Lour.
 Eragrostis aegyptiaca (Willd.) Delile
 Eragrostis amabilis (L.) Wight & Arn.
 Eragrostis aspera (Jacq.) Nees
 Eragrostis atrovirens (Desf.) Trin. ex Steud.
 Eragrostis barteri C.E.Hubb.
 Eragrostis cilianensis (All.) Vignolo ex Janch.
 Eragrostis ciliaris (L.) R.Br.
 Eragrostis domingensis (Pers.) Steud.
 Eragrostis dumasiana A.Chev.
 Eragrostis egregia Clayton
 Eragrostis elegantissima Chiov.
 Eragrostis gangetica (Roxb.) Steud.
 Eragrostis japonica (Thunb.) Trin.
 Eragrostis lingulata Clayton
 Eragrostis pilosa (L.) P.Beauv.
 Eragrostis squamata (Lam.) Steud.
 Eragrostis superba Peyr.
 Eragrostis tremula Hochst. ex Steud.
 Eragrostis turgida (Schumach.) De Wild.
 Eriocaulon afzelianum Wikstr. ex Körn.
 Eriocaulon cinereum R.Br.
 Eriocaulon latifolium Sm.
 Eriocaulon nigericum Meikle
 Eriocaulon plumale N.E.Br.
 Eriocaulon pulchellum Körn.
 Eriocaulon togoense Moldenke
 Eriochloa fatmensis (Hochst. & Steud.) Clayton
 Eriocoelum kerstingii Gilg ex Engl.
 Eriosema afzelii Baker
 Eriosema andohii Milne-Redh.
 Eriosema glomeratum (Guill. & Perr.) Hook.f.
 Eriosema griseum Baker
 Eriosema macrostipulum Baker f.
 Eriosema molle Hutch. ex Milne-Redh.
 Eriosema pellegrinii Tisser.
 Eriosema psoraloides (Lam.) G.Don
 Eriosema pulcherrimum Taub.
 Eriosema sacleuxii Tisser.
 Eriospermum flagelliforme (Baker) J.C.Manning
 Erythrina senegalensis A.DC.
 Erythrina sigmoidea Hua
 Erythrophleum africanum (Welw. ex Benth.) Harms
 Erythrophleum suaveolens (Guill. & Perr.) Brenan
 Erythroxylum emarginatum Thonn.
 Ethulia conyzoides L.f.
 Eucalyptus camaldulensis Dehnh.
 Eucalyptus torreliana F.Muell.
 Euclasta condylotricha (Hochst. ex Steud.) Stapf
 Eugenia nigerina A.Chev.
 Eulophia angolensis (Rchb.f.) Summerh.
 Eulophia cristata (Sw.) Steud.
 Eulophia guineensis Lindl.
 Eulophia juncifolia Summerh.
 Euphorbia baga A.Chev.
 Euphorbia balsamifera Aiton
 Euphorbia convolvuloides Hochst. ex Benth.
 Euphorbia cotinifolia 
 Euphorbia forskalii J.Gay
 Euphorbia glomerifera (Millsp.) L.C.Wheeler
 Euphorbia heterophylla 
 Euphorbia hirta 
 Euphorbia hypericifolia 
 Euphorbia hyssopifolia 
 Euphorbia inaequilatera Sond.
 Euphorbia kerstingii Pax
 Euphorbia macrophylla Pax
 Euphorbia paganorum A.Chev.
 Euphorbia poissoni Pax
 Euphorbia polycnemoides Hochst. ex Boiss.
 Euphorbia prostrata Aiton
 Euphorbia pulcherrima Willd. ex Klotzsch
 Euphorbia scordifolia Jacq.
 Euphorbia serpens Kunth
 Euphorbia sudanica A.Chev.
 Euphorbia thymifolia 
 Euphorbia tirucalli 
 Euphorbia unispina N.E.Br.
 Euploca ovalifolia (Forssk.) Diane & Hilger
 Euploca strigosa (Willd.) Diane & Hilger
 Evolvulus alsinoides (L.) L.
 Evolvulus nummularius (L.) L.
 Excoecaria grahamii Stapf
 Excoecaria guineensis (Benth.) Müll.Arg.
 Fadogia agrestis Schweinf. ex Hiern
 Fadogia andersonii Robyns
 Fadogia cienkowskii Schweinf.
 Fadogia erythrophloea (K.Schum. & K.Krause) Hutch. & Dalziel
 Fadogia pobeguinii Pobeg.
 Fadogia tetraquetra K.Krause
 Faidherbia albida (Delile) A.Chev.
 Faroa pusilla Baker
 Farsetia stenoptera Hochst.
 Feretia apodanthera Delile
 Ficus abutilifolia (Miq.) Miq.
 Ficus artocarpoides Warb.
 Ficus asperifolia Miq.
 Ficus capreifolia Delile
 Ficus carica 
 Ficus cordata Thunb.
 Ficus craterostoma Warb. ex Mildbr. & Burret
 Ficus dicranostyla Mildbr.
 Ficus elasticoides De Wild.
 Ficus exasperata Vahl
 Ficus glumosa Delile
 Ficus ingens (Miq.) Miq.
 Ficus lutea Vahl.
 Ficus natalensis Hochst.
 Ficus ovata Vahl
 Ficus platyphylla Delile
 Ficus polita Vahl
 Ficus populifolia Vahl
 Ficus scott-elliotii Mildbr. & Burret
 Ficus sur Forssk.
 Ficus sycomorus 
 Ficus thonningii Blume
 Ficus trichopoda Baker
 Ficus umbellata Vahl
 Ficus vallis-choudae Delile
 Ficus vogeliana (Miq.) Miq.
 Fimbristylis alboviridis C.B.Clarke
 Fimbristylis barteri Boeckeler
 Fimbristylis bisumbellata (Forssk.) Bubani
 Fimbristylis debilis Steud.
 Fimbristylis dichotoma (L.) Vahl
 Fimbristylis ferruginea (L.) Vahl
 Fimbristylis littoralis Gand.
 Fimbristylis microcarya F.Muell.
 Fimbristylis pilosa (Poir.) Vahl
 Fimbristylis quinquangularis (Vahl) Kunth
 Fimbristylis scabrida Schumach.
 Fimbristylis striolata Napper
 Flabellaria paniculata Cav.
 Flacourtia indica (Burm.f.) Merr.
 Flemingia faginea (Guill. & Perr.) Baker
 Floscopa africana (P.Beauv.) C.B.Clarke
 Floscopa axillaris (Poir.) C.B.Clarke
 Floscopa flavida C.B.Clarke
 Floscopa glomerata (Willd. ex Schult. & Schult.f.) Hassk.
 Flueggea virosa (Roxb. ex Willd.) Voigt
 Fuirena ciliaris (L.) Roxb.
 Fuirena leptostachya Oliv.
 Fuirena stricta Steud.
 Fuirena umbellata Rottb.
 Gaertnera paniculata Benth.
 Garcinia livingstonei T.Anderson
 Garcinia ovalifolia Oliv.
 Gardenia aqualla Stapf & Hutch.
 Gardenia erubescens Stapf & Hutch.
 Gardenia imperialis K.Schum.
 Gardenia nitida Hook.
 Gardenia sokotensis Hutch.
 Gardenia ternifolia Schumach. & Thonn.
 Genlisea africana Oliv.
 Geophila repens (L.) I.M.Johnst.
 Gisekia pharnaceoides 
 Gladiolus atropurpureus Baker
 Gladiolus dalenii Van Geel
 Gladiolus gregarius Welw. ex Baker
 Gladiolus oligophlebius Baker
 Glinus lotoides 
 Glinus oppositifolius (L.) Aug.DC.
 Glinus radiatus (Ruíz & Pav.) Rohrb.
 Gliricidia sepium (Jacq.) Walp.
 Gloriosa simplex 
 Gloriosa superba 
 Glossonema boveanum (Decne.) Decne.
 Gmelina arborea Roxb.
 Gnidia kraussiana Meisn.
 Gomphrena celosioides Mart.
 Gomphrena globosa 
 Gongronema latifolium Benth.
 Gongronema obscurum Bullock
 Gossypium anomalum Wawra ex Wawra & Peyr.
 Gossypium barbadense 
 Gossypium herbaceum 
 Gossypium hirsutum 
 Grangea ceruanoides Cass.
 Grangea maderaspatana (L.) Desf.
 Grewia barteri Burret
 Grewia bicolor Juss.
 Grewia carpinifolia Juss.
 Grewia cissoides Hutch. & Dalziel
 Grewia flavescens Juss.
 Grewia lasiodiscus K.Schum.
 Grewia mollis Juss.
 Grewia tenax (Forssk.) Fiori
 Grewia villosa Willd.
 Guibourtia copallifera Benn.
 Guiera senegalensis J.F.Gmel.
 Gymnema sylvestre (Retz.) Schult.
 Gymnosporia senegalensis (Lam.) Loes.
 Habenaria armatissima Rchb.f.
 Habenaria bongensium Rchb.f.
 Habenaria ichneumonea (Sw.) Lindl.
 Habenaria lecardii Kraenzl.
 Habenaria longirostris Summerh.
 Habenaria procera (Sw. ex Pers.) Lindl.
 Habenaria zambesina Rchb. f.
 Hackelochloa granularis (L.) Kuntze
 Haematostaphis barteri Hook.f.
 Harungana madagascariensis Lam. ex Poir.
 Haumaniastrum caeruleum (Oliv.) P.A.Duvign. & Plancke
 Heliotropium bacciferum Forssk.
 Heliotropium crispum Desf.
 Heliotropium indicum 
 Heliotropium zeylanicum (Burm.f.) Lam.
 Herderia truncata Cass.
 Hermannia tigrensis Hochst. ex A.Rich.
 Heteranthera callifolia Rchb. ex Kunth
 Heteropogon contortus (L.) Roem. & Schult.
 Heteropogon melanocarpus (Elliott) Benth.
 Hexalobus monopetalus (A.Rich.) Engl. & Diels
 Hibiscus articulatus Hochst. ex A.Rich.
 Hibiscus cannabinus 
 Hibiscus congestiflorus Hochr.
 Hibiscus diversifolius Jacq.
 Hibiscus gourmania Hutch. & Dalziel
 Hibiscus lobatus (Murray) Kuntze
 Hibiscus longisepalus Hochr.
 Hibiscus mechowii Garcke
 Hibiscus micranthus L.f.
 Hibiscus owariensis P.Beauv.
 Hibiscus panduriformis Burm.f.
 Hibiscus physaloides Guill. & Perr.
 Hibiscus rosa-sinensis 
 Hibiscus rostellatus Guill. & Perr.
 Hibiscus sabdariffa 
 Hibiscus schizopetalus (Mast.) Hook.f.
 Hibiscus scotellii Baker f.
 Hibiscus sidiformis Baill.
 Hibiscus squamosus Hochr.
 Hibiscus sterculiifolius (Guill. & Perr.) Steud.
 Hibiscus trionum 
 Hibiscus whytei Stapf
 Holarrhena floribunda (G.Don) T.Durand & Schinz
 Hoslundia opposita Vahl
 Hybanthus enneaspermus (L.) F.Muell.
 Hydrolea floribunda Kotschy & Peyr.
 Hydrolea macrosepala A.W.Benn.
 Hydrolea palustris (Aubl.) Raeusch.
 Hygrophila africana (T.Anderson) Heine
 Hygrophila auriculata (Schumach.) Heine
 Hygrophila niokoloensis Berhaut
 Hygrophila odora (Nees) T.Anderson
 Hygrophila pobeguinii Benoist
 Hygrophila senegalensis (Nees) T.Anderson
 Hymenocardia acida Tul.
 Hymenocardia heudelotii Müll.Arg.
 Hymenocardia lyrata Tul.
 Hyparrhenia bagirmica (Stapf) Stapf
 Hyparrhenia barteri (Hack.) Stapf
 Hyparrhenia bracteata (Humb. & Bonpl. ex Willd.) Stapf
 Hyparrhenia cyanescens (Stapf) Stapf
 Hyparrhenia diplandra (Hack.) Stapf
 Hyparrhenia exarmata (Stapf) Stapf
 Hyparrhenia filipendula (Hochst.) Stapf
 Hyparrhenia glabriuscula (Hochst. ex A.Rich.) Stapf
 Hyparrhenia involucrata Stapf
 Hyparrhenia rudis Stapf
 Hyparrhenia rufa (Nees) Stapf
 Hyparrhenia smithiana (Hook.f.) Stapf
 Hyparrhenia subplumosa Stapf
 Hyparrhenia violascens (Stapf) Clayton
 Hyparrhenia welwitschii (Rendle) Stapf
 Hyperthelia dissoluta (Nees ex Steud.) Clayton
 Hyphaene thebaica (L.) Mart.
 Hypoestes aristata (Vahl) Sol. ex Roem. & Schult.
 Hypoestes cancellata Nees
 Hypoestes forskaolii (Vahl) R.Br.
 Hypoestes strobilifera S.Moore
 Hyptis lanceolata Poir.
 Hyptis spicigera Lam.
 Hyptis suaveolens Poit.
 Imperata cylindrica (L.) Raeusch.
 Indigofera aspera Perr. ex DC.
 Indigofera barteri Hutch. & Dalziel
 Indigofera berhautiana J.B.Gillett
 Indigofera bracteolata DC.
 Indigofera capitata Kotschy
 Indigofera colutea (Burm.f.) Merr.
 Indigofera congesta Welw. ex Baker
 Indigofera congolensis De Wild. & T.Durand
 Indigofera conjugata Baker
 Indigofera costata Guill. & Perr.
 Indigofera dendroides Jacq.
 Indigofera diphylla Vent.
 Indigofera fulvopilosa Brenan
 Indigofera geminata Baker
 Indigofera hirsuta 
 Indigofera hochstetteri Baker
 Indigofera kerstingii Harms
 Indigofera leprieurii Baker f.
 Indigofera leptoclada Harms
 Indigofera macrocalyx Guill. & Perr.
 Indigofera macrophylla Schumach. & Thonn.
 Indigofera microcarpa Desv.
 Indigofera nigricans Vahl ex Pers.
 Indigofera nigritana Hook.f.
 Indigofera nummulariifolia (L.) Livera ex Alston
 Indigofera oblongifolia Forssk.
 Indigofera omissa J.B.Gillett
 Indigofera oubanguiensis Tisser.
 Indigofera paniculata Vahl ex Pers.
 Indigofera pilosa Poir.
 Indigofera polysphaera Baker
 Indigofera prieureana Guill. & Perr.
 Indigofera pulchra Willd.
 Indigofera secundiflora Poir.
 Indigofera senegalensis Lam.
 Indigofera sessiliflora DC.
 Indigofera simplicifolia Lam.
 Indigofera spicata Forssk.
 Indigofera stenophylla Guill. & Perr.
 Indigofera strobilifera (Hochst.) Hochst. ex Baker
 Indigofera suffruticosa Mill.
 Indigofera terminalis Baker
 Indigofera tetrasperma Vahl ex Pers.
 Indigofera tinctoria L.
 Indigofera trichopoda Lepr. ex Guill. & Perr.
 Indigofera trita L.f.
 Iphigenia pauciflora Martelli
 Ipomoea aquatica Forssk.
 Ipomoea argentaurata Hallier f.
 Ipomoea asarifolia (Desr.) Roem. & Schult.
 Ipomoea barteri Baker
 Ipomoea batatas (L.) Lam.
 Ipomoea blepharophylla Hallier f.
 Ipomoea cairica (L.) Sweet
 Ipomoea carnea Jacq.
 Ipomoea chrysochaetia Hallier.f.
 Ipomoea coptica (L.) Roth ex Roem. & Schult.
 Ipomoea coscinosperma Hochst. ex Choisy
 Ipomoea dichroa Choisy
 Ipomoea eriocarpa R.Br.
 Ipomoea heterotricha Didr.
 Ipomoea involucrata P.Beauv.
 Ipomoea kotschyana Hochst. ex Choisy
 Ipomoea marginata (Desr.) Verdc.
 Ipomoea mauritiana Jacq.
 Ipomoea nil (L.) Roth
 Ipomoea obscura (L.) Ker Gawl.
 Ipomoea ochracea (Lindl.) G.Don
 Ipomoea pes-tigridis L.
 Ipomoea pileata Roxb.
 Ipomoea quamoclit L.
 Ipomoea rubens Choisy
 Ipomoea setifera Poir.
 Ipomoea triloba L.
 Ipomoea turbinata Lag.
 Ipomoea vagans Baker
 Ipomoea verbascoidea Choisy
 Ipomoea verticillata Forssk.
 Ischaemum afrum (J.F.Gmel.) Dandy
 Ischaemum amethystinum J.-P.Lebrun
 Ischaemum fasciculatum Brongn.
 Ischaemum rugosum Salisb.
 Isoberlinia doka Craib & Stapf
 Isoberlinia tomentosa (Harms) Craib & Stapf
 Isoetes jaegeri Pitot
 Isoetes nigritiana A.Br. ex Kuhn
 Isoetes schweinfurthii Baker
 Ixora brachypoda DC.
 Ixora javanica (Blume) DC.
 Jacquemontia tamnifolia (L.) Griseb.
 Jasminum dichotomum Vahl
 Jasminum kerstingii Gilg & G.Schellenb.
 Jasminum obtusifolium Baker
 Jatropha curcas L.
 Jatropha gossypiifolia L.
 Jatropha integerrima Jacq.
 Jatropha kamerunica Pax & K.Hoffm.
 Justicia flava (Vahl) Vahl
 Justicia insularis T.Anderson
 Justicia ladanoides Lam.
 Justicia striata (Klotzsch) Bullock
 Justicia tenella (Nees) T.Anderson
 Kalanchoe crenata (Andrews) Haw.
 Kalanchoe lanceolata (Forssk.) Pers.
 Kallstroemia pubescens (G.Don) Dandy
 Keetia cornelia (Cham. & Schltdl.) Bridson
 Keetia leucantha (K.Krause) Bridson
 Keetia mannii (Hiern) Bridson
 Keetia venosa (Oliv.) Bridson
 Khaya grandifoliola C.DC.
 Khaya senegalensis (Desr.) A.Juss.
 Kigelia africana (Lam.) Benth.
 Kinghamia macrocephala (Oliv. & Hiern) C.Jeffrey
 Kinghamia nigritana (Benth.) C.Jeffrey
 Kohautia confusa (Hutch. & Dalziel) Bremek.
 Kohautia grandiflora DC.
 Kohautia tenuis (Bowdich) Mabb.
 Kosteletzkya buettneri Gürke
 Kosteletzkya grantii (Mast.) Garcke
 Kyllinga bulbosa P.Beauv.
 Kyllinga debilis C.B.Clarke
 Kyllinga echinata S.S.Hooper
 Kyllinga erecta Schumach.
 Kyllinga odorata Vahl
 Kyllinga pumila Michx.
 Kyllinga squamulata Thonn. ex Vahl
 Kyllinga tenuifolia Steud.
 Kyllingiella microcephala (Steud.) R.W.Haines & Lye
 Lablab purpureus (L.) Sweet.
 Lactuca inermis Forssk.
 Lactuca praevia C.D.Adams
 Lactuca sativa L.
 Lagarosiphon muscoides Harv.
 Lagenaria breviflora (Benth.) Roberty
 Lagenaria siceraria (Molina) Standl.
 Lagerstroemia indica L.
 Landolphia dulcis (Sabine) Pichon
 Landolphia heudelotii A.DC.
 Landolphia hirsuta (Hua) Pichon
 Landolphia owariensis P.Beauv.
 Lannea acida A.Rich.
 Lannea barteri (Oliv.) Engl.
 Lannea egregia Engl. & K.Krause
 Lannea fruticosa (Hochst. ex A.Rich.) Engl.
 Lannea microcarpa Engl. & K.Krause
 Lannea velutina A.Rich.
 Lantana camara L.
 Lantana ukambensis (Vatke) Verdc.
 Laportea aestuans (L.) Chew
 Launaea brunneri (Webb) Amin ex Boulos
 Launaea intybacea (Jacq.) Beauverd
 Launaea nana (Baker) Chiov.
 Launaea taraxacifolia (Willd.) Amin ex C.Jeffrey
 Lawsonia inermis L.
 Lecaniodiscus cupanioides Planch.
 Ledebouria sudanica (A.Chev.) Burg
 Leea guineensis G.Don
 Leersia drepanothrix Stapf
 Leersia hexandra Sw.
 Lemna aequinoctialis Welw.
 Leonotis nepetifolia (L.) R.Br.
 Lepidagathis alopecuroides (Vahl) R.Br. ex Griseb.
 Lepidagathis anobrya Nees
 Lepidagathis capituliformis Benoist
 Lepidagathis collina (Endl.) Milne-Redh.
 Lepidagathis hamiltoniana Wall.
 Lepidagathis heudelotiana Nees
 Lepidagathis sericea Benoist
 Lepidium sativum L.
 Lepistemon owariense (P.Beauv.) Hallier f.
 Leptadenia arborea (Forssk.) Schweinf.
 Leptadenia hastata (Pers.) Decne.
 Leptadenia pyrotechnica (Forssk.) Decne.
 Leptochloa coerulescens Steud.
 Leptoderris brachyptera (Benth.) Dunn
 Leptothrium senegalense (Kunth) Clayton
 Leucaena leucocephala (Lam.) de Wit
 Leucas martinicensis (Jacq.) R.Br.
 Limeum diffusum (J.Gay) Schinz
 Limeum pterocarpum (J.Gay) Heimerl
 Limeum viscosum (J.Gay) Fenzl
 Limnophila barteri Skan
 Limnophila dasyantha (Engl. & Gilg) Skan
 Limnophila indica (L.) Druce
 Limnophyton obtusifolium (L.) Miq.
 Lindernia diffusa (L.) Wettst.
 Lindernia exilis Philcox
 Lindernia parviflora (Roxb.) Haines
 Lindernia schweinfurthii (Engl.) Dandy
 Lindernia senegalensis (Benth.) Skan
 Linzia nigritiana (Oliv. & Hiern) Isawumi
 Linzia purpurea (Sch.Bip. ex Walp.) Isawumi
 Lipocarpha albiceps Ridl.
 Lipocarpha atra Ridl.
 Lipocarpha chinensis (Osbeck) Kern
 Lipocarpha filiformis (Vahl) Kunth
 Lipocarpha gracilis Nees
 Lipocarpha kernii (Raymond) Goetgh.
 Lipocarpha prieuriana Steud.
 Lippia chevalieri Moldenke
 Lippia multiflora Moldenke
 Litogyne gariepina (DC.) Anderb.
 Lobelia djurensis Engl. & Diels
 Loeseneriella africana (Willd.) N.Hallé
 Lonchocarpus sericeus (Poir.) Kunth
 Lophira lanceolata Tiegh. ex Keay
 Loudetia annua (Stapf) C.E.Hubb.
 Loudetia arundinacea (A.Rich.) Steud.
 Loudetia flavida (Stapf) C.E.Hubb.
 Loudetia hordeiformis (Stapf) C.E.Hubb.
 Loudetia kagerensis (K.Schum.) C.E.Hubb. ex Hutch.
 Loudetia phragmitoides (Peter) C.E.Hubb.
 Loudetia simplex (Nees) C.E.Hubb.
 Loudetia togoensis (Pilg.) C.E.Hubb.
 Loudetiopsis ambiens (K.Schum.) Conert
 Loudetiopsis capillipes (C.E.Hubb.) Conert
 Loudetiopsis chrysothrix (Nees) Conert
 Loudetiopsis kerstingii (Pilg.) Conert
 Loudetiopsis pobeguinii (Jacq.-Fél.) Clayton
 Loudetiopsis scaettae (A.Camus) Clayton
 Loudetiopsis thoroldii (C.E.Hubb.) J.B.Phipps
 Loudetiopsis tristachyoides (Trin.) Conert
 Ludwigia abyssinica A.Rich.
 Ludwigia adscendens (L.) Hara
 Ludwigia africana (Brenan) Hara
 Ludwigia decurrens Walter
 Ludwigia erecta (L.) Hara
 Ludwigia hyssopifolia (G.Don) Exell
 Ludwigia leptocarpa (Nutt.) H.Hara
 Ludwigia octovalvis (Jacq.) P.H.Raven
 Ludwigia perennis L.
 Ludwigia senegalensis (DC.) Troch.
 Ludwigia stenorraphe (Brenan) Hara
 Luffa acutangula (L.) M.Roem.
 Luffa cylindrica (L.) M.Roem.
 Lycopersicon esculentum Mill.
 Lycopodiella affinis (Bory) Pic. Serm.
 Macaranga schweinfurthii Pax
 Macledium sessiliflorum (Harv.) S.Ortiz
 Macroptilium atropurpureum (DC.) Urb.
 Macroptilium lathyroides (L.) Urb.
 Macrosphyra longistyla (DC.) Hiern
 Macrotyloma africanum (R.Wilczek) Verdc.
 Macrotyloma biflorum (Schumach. & Thonn.) Hepper
 Macrotyloma geocarpum (Harms) Maréchal & Baudet
 Macrotyloma stenophyllum (Harms) Verdc.
 Maerua angolensis DC.
 Maerua crassifolia Forssk.
 Maerua de-waillyi Aubrév. & Pellegr.
 Maerua oblongifolia (Forssk.) A.Rich.
 Maerua pseudopetalosa (Gilg & Gilg-Ben.) DeWolf
 Malachra radiata (L.) L.
 Mallotus oppositifolius (Geiseler) Müll.Arg.
 Malvastrum coromandelianum (L.) Garcke
 Mangifera indica L.
 Manihot esculenta Crantz
 Manihot glaziovii Müll.Arg.
 Manilkara multinervis (Baker) Dubard
 Manilkara obovata (Sabine & G.Don) J.H.Hemsl.
 Maranthes polyandra (Benth.) Prance
 Marantochloa purpurea (Ridl.) Milne-Redh.
 Margaritaria discoidea (Baill.) G.L.Webster
 Mariscus cylindristachyus Steud.
 Mariscus flabelliformis Kunth
 Mariscus luridus C.B.Clarke
 Mariscus schweinfurthii Chiov.
 Mariscus squarrosus (L.) C.B.Clarke
 Mariscus sumatrensis (Retz.) J.Raynal
 Markhamia tomentosa (Benth.) K.Schum. ex Engl.
 Marsilea berhautii Tardieu
 Marsilea distorta A.Br.
 Marsilea gibba A.Br.
 Marsilea minuta L.
 Marsilea trichopoda A.Br.
 Martynia annua L.
 Melanthera abyssinica (Sch.Bip. ex A.Rich.) Vatke
 Melanthera elliptica O.Hoffm.
 Melanthera gambica Hutch. & Dalziel
 Melanthera rhombifolia O.Hoffm. & Muschl.
 Melanthera scandens (Schumach. & Thonn.) Roberty
 Melastomastrum afzelii (Hook.f.) A.Fern. & R.Fern.
 Melastomastrum capitatum (Vahl) A.Fern. & R.Fern.
 Melia azedarach L.
 Melicoccus bijugatus Jacq.
 Melinis repens (Willd.) Zizka
 Melinis tenuissima Stapf
 Melliniella micrantha Harms
 Melochia corchorifolia L.
 Melochia melissifolia Benth.
 Merremia aegyptia (L.) Urb.
 Merremia dissecta (Jacq.) Hallier f.
 Merremia emarginata (Burm.f.) Hallier f.
 Merremia hederacea (Burm.f.) Hallier f.
 Merremia kentrocaulos (C.B.Clarke) Hallier f.
 Merremia pinnata (Hochst. ex Choisy) Hallier f.
 Merremia pterygocaulos (Choisy) Hallier f.
 Merremia tridentata (L.) Hallier f.
 Merremia umbellata (L.) Hallier f.
 Mezoneuron benthamianum Baill.
 Micrargeria filiformis (Schumach. & Thonn.) Hutch. & Dalziel
 Microchloa indica (L.f.) P.Beauv.
 Microchloa kunthii Desv.
 Micrococca mercurialis (L.) Benth.
 Mikania chevalieri (C.D.Adams) W.C.Holmes & McDaniel
 Milicia excelsa (Welw.) C.C.Berg
 Mimosa pigra L.
 Mimosa pudica L.
 Mimusops kummel A.DC.
 Mirabilis jalapa L.
 Mitracarpus hirtus (L.) DC.
 Mitragyna inermis (Willd.) Kuntze
 Mollugo cerviana (L.) Ser. ex DC.
 Mollugo nudicaulis Lam.
 Momordica balsamina L.
 Momordica charantia L.
 Monanthotaxis parvifolia (Oliv.) Verdc.
 Monechma ciliatum (Jacq.) Milne-Redh.
 Monechma depauperatum (T.Anderson) C.B.Clarke
 Monechma ndellense (Lindau) J.Miège & Heine
 Monochoria brevipetiolata Verdc.
 Monocymbium ceresiiforme (Nees) Stapf
 Monotes kerstingii Gilg
 Monsonia senegalensis Guill. & Perr.
 Morelia senegalensis A.Rich.
 Moringa oleifera L.
 Mucuna poggei Taub.
 Mucuna pruriens (L.) DC.
 Multidentia pobeguinii (Hutch. & Dalziel) Bridson
 Murdannia simplex (Vahl) Brenan
 Musa x paradisiaca L.
 Mussaenda elegans Schumach. & Thonn.
 Myrianthus serratus (Trécul) Benth. & Hook.
 Najas baldwinii Horn
 Najas welwitschii Rendle
 Napoleonaea heudelotii A.Juss.
 Napoleonaea vogelii Hook. & Planch.
 Nelsonia canescens (Lam.) Spreng.
 Nelsonia smithii Oerst.
 Nemum spadiceum (Lam.) Desv. ex Ham.
 Neohyptis paniculata (Baker) J.K.Morton
 Neorautanenia mitis (A.Rich.) Verdc.
 Nephrolepis biserrata (Sw.) Schott
 Nephrolepis undulata (Afzel. ex Sw.) J. Sm.
 Nephthytis afzelii Schott
 Neptunia oleracea Lour.
 Nerium oleander L.
 Nervilia adolphi Schltr.
 Nervilia bicarinata (Blume) Schltr.
 Nervilia fuerstenbergiana Schltr.
 Nervilia kotschyi (Rchb.f.) Schltr.
 Nervilia simplex (Thouars) Schltr.
 Nesaea cordata Hiern
 Nesaea mossiensis A.Chev.
 Nesphostylis holosericea (Baker) Verdc.
 Neurotheca loeselioides (Spruce ex Progel) Baill.
 Newbouldia laevis (P.Beauv.) Seem. ex Bureau
 Nicotiana rustica L.
 Nicotiana tabacum L.
 Nothosaerva brachiata (L.) Wight
 Nymphaea lotus L.
 Nymphaea maculata Schumach. & Thonn.
 Nymphaea micrantha Guill. & Perr.
 Nymphoides ezannoi Berhaut
 Nymphoides indica (L.) Kuntze
 Ochna afzelii R.Br. ex Oliv.
 Ochna rhizomatosa (Tiegh.) Keay
 Ochna schweinfurthiana F.Hoffm.
 Ocimum americanum L.
 Ocimum basilicum L.
 Ocimum gratissimum L.
 Ocimum irvinei J.K.Morton
 Oeceoclades maculata (Lindl.) Lindl.
 Olax subscorpioidea Oliv.
 Oldenlandia affinis (Roem. & Schult.) DC.
 Oldenlandia capensis L.f.
 Oldenlandia corymbosa L.
 Oldenlandia herbacea (L.) Roxb.
 Oldenlandia lancifolia (Schumach.) DC.
 Olyra latifolia L.
 Omphalogonus calophyllus Baill.
 Oncoba spinosa Forssk.
 Ophioglossum costatum R.Br.
 Ophioglossum gomezianum Welw. ex A.Br.
 Ophioglossum reticulatum L.
 Opilia amentacea Roxb.
 Oplismenus burmannii (Retz.) P.Beauv.
 Oplismenus hirtellus (L.) P.Beauv.
 Orbea decaisneana (Lehm.) Bruyns
 Ornithogalum viride (L.) J.C.Manning & Goldblatt
 Oropetium aristatum (Stapf) Pilg.
 Orthosiphon pallidus Royle ex Benth.
 Orthosiphon rubicundus (D.Don) Benth.
 Oryza barthii A.Chev.
 Oryza glaberrima Steud.
 Oryza longistaminata A.Chev. & Roehr.
 Oryza sativa L.
 Osbeckia tubulosa Sm.
 Osmunda regalis L.
 Ottelia ulvifolia (Planch.) Walp.
 Oxalis corniculata L.
 Oxyanthus racemosus (Schum. & Thonn.) Keay
 Oxycaryum cubense (Poepp. & Kunth) Lye
 Oxystelma bornouense R.Br.
 Oxytenanthera abyssinica (A.Rich.) Munro
 Ozoroa obovata (Oliv.) R.Fern. & A.Fern.
 Ozoroa pulcherrima (Schweinf.) R.Fern. & A.Fern.
 Pachycarpus lineolatus (Decne.) Bullock
 Pancratium tenuifolium Hochst. ex A.Rich.
 Pancratium trianthum Herb.
 Pandanus brevifrugalis Huynh
 Pandiaka angustifolia (Vahl) Hepper
 Pandiaka involucrata (Moq.) B.D.Jacks.
 Panicum afzelii Sw.
 Panicum anabaptistum Steud.
 Panicum antidotale Retz.
 Panicum brazzavillense Franch.
 Panicum brevifolium L.
 Panicum coloratum L.
 Panicum congoense Franch.
 Panicum dregeanum Nees
 Panicum fluviicola Steud.
 Panicum griffonii Franch.
 Panicum humile Nees ex Steud.
 Panicum laetum Kunth
 Panicum laxum Sw.
 Panicum maximum Jacq.
 Panicum nervatum (Franch.) Stapf
 Panicum nigerense Hitchc.
 Panicum pansum Rendle
 Panicum parvifolium Lam.
 Panicum phragmitoides Stapf
 Panicum pilgeri Mez
 Panicum praealtum Afzel. ex Sw.
 Panicum subalbidum Kunth
 Panicum tenellum Lam.
 Panicum turgidum Forssk.
 Parahyparrhenia annua (Hack.) Clayton
 Parahyparrhenia perennis Clayton
 Paratheria prostrata Griseb.
 Parinari congensis Didr.
 Parinari curatellifolia Planch. ex Benth.
 Parinari excelsa Sabine
 Parkia biglobosa (Jacq.) R.Br. ex G.Don
 Parkinsonia aculeata L.
 Paspalidium geminatum (Forssk.) Stapf
 Paspalum conjugatum P.J.Bergius
 Paspalum scrobiculatum L.
 Paspalum vaginatum Sw.
 Passiflora edulis Sims
 Passiflora foetida L.
 Paullinia pinnata L.
 Pavetta corymbosa (DC.) F.N.Williams
 Pavetta crassipes K.Schum.
 Pavetta lasioclada (K.Krause) Mildbr. ex Bremek.
 Pavetta oblongifolia (Hiern) Bremek.
 Pavonia senegalensis (Cav.) Leistner
 Pavonia triloba Guill. & Perr.
 Peltophorum pterocarpum (DC.) K.Heyne
 Pennisetum glaucum (L.) R.Br.
 Pennisetum hordeoides (Lam.) Steud.
 Pennisetum pedicellatum Trin.
 Pennisetum polystachion (L.) Schult.
 Pennisetum setigerum (Vahl) Wipff
 Pennisetum sieberianum (Schltr.) Stapf & C.E.Hubb.
 Pennisetum unisetum (Nees) Benth.
 Pennisetum violaceum (Lam.) Rich.
 Pentadesma butyracea Sabine
 Pentanema indicum (L.) Y.Ling
 Pentatropis nivalis (J.F.Gmel.) D.V.Field & J.R.I.Wood
 Peperomia pellucida H.B. & K.
 Pergularia daemia (Forssk.) Chiov.
 Pergularia tomentosa L.
 Pericopsis laxiflora (Benth.) Meeuwen
 Periploca nigrescens Afzel.
 Perotis indica (L.) Kuntze
 Perotis patens Gand.
 Perotis scabra Willd. ex Trin.
 Persea americana Mill.
 Persicaria decipiens (R.Br.) K.L.Wilson
 Persicaria limbata (Meisn.) H.Hara
 Persicaria madagascariensis (Meisn.) S.Ortíz & Paiva
 Persicaria senegalensis (Meisn.) Soják
 Phaseolus vulgaris L.
 Phaulopsis barteri T.Anderson
 Phaulopsis ciliata (Willd.) Hepper
 Phaulopsis imbricata (Forssk.) Sweet
 Philenoptera cyanescens (Schumach. & Thonn.) Roberty
 Philenoptera laxiflora (Guill. & Perr.) Roberty
 Phoenix dactylifera L.
 Phoenix reclinata Jacq.
 Phragmites australis (Cav.) Steud.
 Phragmites karka (Retz.) Steud.
 Phyla nodiflora (L.) Greene
 Phyllanthus alpestris Beille
 Phyllanthus amarus Schumach. & Thonn.
 Phyllanthus beillei Hutch.
 Phyllanthus fraternus G.L.Webster
 Phyllanthus maderaspatensis L.
 Phyllanthus muellerianus (Kuntze) Exell
 Phyllanthus pentandrus Schumach. & Thonn.
 Phyllanthus reticulatus Poir.
 Phyllanthus rotundifolius Klein ex Willd.
 Phyllanthus sublanatus Schumach. & Thonn.
 Phyllanthus welwitschianus Müll.Arg.
 Physalis angulata L.
 Physalis lagascae Roem. & Schult.
 Piliostigma reticulatum (DC.) Hochst.
 Piliostigma thonningii (Schumach.) Milne-Redh.
 Pistia stratiotes L.
 Pithecellobium dulce (Roxb.) Benth.
 Pityrogramma calomelanos (L.) Link
 Platostoma africanum P.Beauv.
 Platycoryne paludosa (Lindl.) Rolfe
 Plectranthus bojeri (Benth.) Hedge
 Plectranthus chevalieri (Briq.) B.J.Pollard & A.J.Paton
 Plectranthus esculentus N.E.Br.
 Plectranthus gracillimus (T.C.E.Fr.) Hutch. & Dandy
 Plectranthus monostachyus (P.Beauv.) B.J.Pollard
 Pluchea ovalis (Pers.) DC.
 Plumbago auriculata Lam.
 Plumbago zeylanica L.
 Plumeria alba L.
 Plumeria rubra L.
 Polycarpaea billei J.-P.Lebrun
 Polycarpaea corymbosa (L.) Lam.
 Polycarpaea eriantha Hochst. ex A.Rich.
 Polycarpaea linearifolia (DC.) DC.
 Polycarpaea tenuifolia (Willd.) DC.
 Polycarpon prostratum (Forssk.) Asch. & Schweinf.
 Polygala acicularis Oliv.
 Polygala arenaria Willd.
 Polygala atacorensis Jacq.-Fél.
 Polygala baikiei Chodat
 Polygala butyracea Heckel
 Polygala capillaris E.Mey. ex Harv.
 Polygala erioptera DC.
 Polygala guineensis Willd.
 Polygala irregularis Boiss.
 Polygala multiflora Poir.
 Polygala petitiana A.Rich.
 Polygonum plebeium R.Br.
 Polygonum pulchrum Blume
 Polystachya golungensis Rchb.f.
 Porphyrostemma chevalieri (O.Hoffm.) Hutch. & Dalziel
 Portulaca foliosa Ker Gawl.
 Portulaca grandiflora Hook.
 Portulaca oleracea L.
 Portulaca quadrifida L.
 Potamogeton octandrus Poir.
 Potamogeton schweinfurthii A.Benn.
 Pouchetia africana A.Rich. ex DC.
 Pouteria alnifolia (Baker) Roberty
 Pouzolzia guineensis Benth.
 Premna lucens A.Chev.
 Prosopis africana (Guill. & Perr.) Taub.
 Prosopis chilensis (Molina) Stuntz
 Prosopis juliflora (Sw.) DC.
 Protea madiensis Oliv.
 Pseudarthria fagifolia Baker
 Pseudarthria hookeri Wight & Arn.
 Pseudechinolaena polystachya (Kunth) Stapf
 Pseudocedrela kotschyi (Schweinf.) Harms
 Pseudoconyza viscosa (Mill.) D'Arcy
 Pseudognaphalium luteoalbum (L.) Hilliard & B.L.Burtt
 Pseudospondias microcarpa (A.Rich.) Engl.
 Psidium guajava L.
 Psophocarpus monophyllus Harms
 Psophocarpus palustris Desv.
 Psorospermum corymbiferum Hochr.
 Psorospermum febrifugum Spach
 Psorospermum glaberrimum Hochr.
 Psorospermum senegalense Spach
 Psychotria psychotrioides (DC.) Roberty
 Psychotria vogeliana Benth.
 Psydrax acutiflora (Hiern) Bridson
 Psydrax horizontalis (Schumach.) Bridson
 Psydrax parviflora (Afzel.) Bridson
 Psydrax subcordata (DC.) Bridson
 Pteleopsis habeensis Aubrév. ex Keay
 Pteleopsis suberosa Engl. & Diels
 Pterocarpus erinaceus Poir.
 Pterocarpus lucens Lepr. ex Guill. & Perr.
 Pterocarpus santalinoides DC.
 Pulicaria incisa (Lam.) DC.
 Pulicaria undulata (L.) C.A.Mey.
 Punica granatum L.
 Pupalia lappacea (L.) A.Juss.
 Pycnocycla ledermannii H.Wolff
 Pycreus acuticarinatus (Kük.) Cherm.
 Pycreus aethiops (Welw. ex Ridl.) C.B.Clarke
 Pycreus capillifolius (A.Rich.) C.B.Clarke
 Pycreus flavescens (L.) P.Beauv. ex Rchb.
 Pycreus lanceolatus (Poir.) C.B.Clarke
 Pycreus macrostachyos (Lam.) J.Raynal
 Pycreus melas (Ridl.) C.B.Clarke
 Pycreus mundtii Nees
 Pycreus pseudodiaphanus S.S.Hooper
 Pycreus pumilus (L.) Domin
 Pycreus smithianus (Ridl.) C.B.Clarke
 Pycreus unioloides (R.Br.) Urb.
 Quassia undulata (Guill. & Perr.) F.Dietr.
 Raphia sudanica A.Chev.
 Raphionacme brownii Scott-Elliot
 Raphionacme splendens Schlechter
 Raphionacme vignei Bruce
 Rauvolfia vomitoria Afzel.
 Ravenala madagascariensis Sonn.
 Requienia obcordata (Lam. ex Poir.) DC.
 Rhamphicarpa fistulosa (Hochst.) Benth.
 Rhaphiostylis beninensis Planch.
 Rhus crenulata A.Rich.
 Rhus longipes Engl.
 Rhynchosia albae-pauli Berhaut
 Rhynchosia buettneri Harms
 Rhynchosia densiflora (Roth) DC.
 Rhynchosia hirta (Andrews) Meikle & Verdc.
 Rhynchosia minima (L.) DC.
 Rhynchosia nyasica Baker
 Rhynchosia procurrens (Hiern) K.Schum.
 Rhynchosia pycnostachya (DC.) Meikle
 Rhynchosia resinosa (Hochst. ex A.Rich.) Baker
 Rhynchosia sublobata (Schumach. & Thonn.) Meikle
 Rhynchospora candida (Nees) Boeckeler
 Rhynchospora corymbosa (L.) Britton
 Rhynchospora eximia (Nees) Boeckeler
 Rhynchospora gracillima Thwaites
 Rhynchospora perrieri Cherm.
 Rhynchospora triflora Vahl
 Rhytachne furtiva Clayton
 Rhytachne rottboellioides Desv.
 Rhytachne triaristata (Steud.) Stapf
 Richardia brasiliensis Gomes
 Ricinus communis L.
 Ritchiea capparoides (Andrews) Britten
 Ritchiea erecta Hook.f.
 Ritchiea reflexa (Thonn.) Gilg & Gilg-Ben.
 Rogeria adenophylla J.Gay ex Delile
 Rotala elatinoides (DC.) Hiern
 Rotala mexicana Cham. & Schltdl.
 Rotala stagnina Hiern
 Rotala tenella (Guill. & Perr.) Hiern
 Rotala welwitschii Exell
 Rotheca alata (Gürke) Verdc.
 Rothia hirsuta (Guill. & Perr.) Baker
 Rothmannia longiflora Salisb.
 Rottboellia cochinchinensis (Lour.) Clayton
 Rotula aquatica Lour.
 Rourea coccinea (Thonn. ex Schumach.) Benth.
 Rourea minor (Gaertn.) Alston
 Ruellia patula Jacq.
 Ruellia praetermissa Schweinf. ex Lindau
 Rutidea parviflora DC.
 Rytigynia senegalensis Blume
 Rytigynia umbellulata (Hiern) Robyns
 Saba comorensis (Bojer ex A.DC.) Pichon
 Saba senegalensis (A.DC.) Pichon
 Saba thompsonii (A.Chev.) Pichon
 Sabicea brevipes Wernham
 Sabicea venosa Benth.
 Saccharum officinarum L.
 Saccharum spontaneum L.
 Sacciolepis africana C.E.Hubb. & Snowden
 Sacciolepis chevalieri Stapf
 Sacciolepis ciliocincta (Pilg.) Stapf
 Sacciolepis cymbiandra Stapf
 Sacciolepis indica (L.) Chase
 Sacciolepis micrococca Mez
 Sagittaria guayanensis Humb., Bonpl. & Kunth
 Salacia owabiensis Hoyle
 Salacia pallescens Oliv.
 Salacia pyriformis (Sabine) Steud.
 Salacia stuhlmanniana Loes.
 Salvadora persica L.
 Sansevieria liberica Gérôme & Labroy
 Sansevieria longiflora Sims
 Sansevieria senegambica Baker
 Sarcocephalus latifolius (Sm.) E.A.Bruce
 Sarcocephalus pobeguinii Pobeg.
 Sarcostemma viminale (L.) R.Br.
 Sauvagesia erecta L.
 Scadoxus multiflorus (Martyn) Raf.
 Schizachyrium brevifolium (Sw.) Nees ex Büse
 Schizachyrium exile (Hochst.) Pilg.
 Schizachyrium nodulosum (Hack.) Stapf
 Schizachyrium penicillatum Jacq.-Fél.
 Schizachyrium platyphyllum (Franch.) Stapf
 Schizachyrium ruderale Clayton
 Schizachyrium rupestre (K.Schum.) Stapf
 Schizachyrium sanguineum (Retz.) Alston
 Schizachyrium schweinfurthii (Hack.) Stapf
 Schizachyrium urceolatum (Hack.) Stapf
 Schoenefeldia gracilis Kunth
 Schoenoplectiella juncea (Willd.) Lye
 Schoenoplectiella lateriflora (J.F.Gmel.) Lye
 Schoenoplectiella roylei (Nees) Lye
 Schoenoplectiella senegalensis (Hochst. ex Steud.) Lye
 Schoenoplectus corymbosus (Roth ex Roem. & Schult.) J.Raynal
 Schoenoplectus litoralis (Schrad.) Palla
 Schoenoplectus subulatus (Vahl) Lye
 Schouwia purpurea (Forssk.) Schweinf.
 Schultesia stenophylla Mart.
 Schwenckia americana L.
 Scleria achtenii De Wild.
 Scleria bulbifera Hochst. ex A.Rich.
 Scleria depressa (C.B.Clarke) Nelmes
 Scleria distans Poir.
 Scleria foliosa Hochst. ex A.Rich.
 Scleria lacustris C.Wright
 Scleria lagoensis Boeckeler
 Scleria lithosperma (L.) Sw.
 Scleria melaleuca Rchb. ex Schltr. & Cham.
 Scleria melanotricha Hochst. ex A.Rich.
 Scleria mikawana Makino
 Scleria naumanniana Boeckeler
 Scleria pergracilis (Nees) Kunth
 Scleria racemosa Poir.
 Scleria sphaerocarpa (E.A.Rob.) Napper
 Scleria tessellata Willd.
 Sclerocarpus africanus Jacq. ex Murray
 Sclerocarya birrea (A.Rich.) Hochst.
 Scoparia dulcis L.
 Sebastiania chamaelea (L.) Müll.Arg.
 Secamone afzelii (Schult.) K.Schum.
 Securidaca longipedunculata Fresen.
 Sehima ischaemoides Forssk.
 Selaginella protensa Alston
 Senegalia ataxacantha DC.
 Senegalia gourmaensis A.Chev.
 Senegalia laeta R.Br. ex Benth.
 Senegalia macrostachya Rchb. ex DC.
 Senegalia polyacantha Willd.
 Senegalia senegal (L.) Willd.
 Senna alata (L.) Roxb.
 Senna hirsuta L.
 Senna italica Mill.
 Senna obtusifolia L.
 Senna occidentalis L.
 Senna podocarpa Guill. & Perr.
 Senna siamea Lam.
 Senna singueana Delile
 Senna surattensis Burm.f.
 Sericanthe chevalieri (K.Krause) Robbr.
 Sesamum alatum Thonn.
 Sesamum indicum L.
 Sesamum radiatum Schumach. & Thonn.
 Sesbania bispinosa (Jacq.) W.Wight
 Sesbania dalzielii E.Phillips & Hutch.
 Sesbania leptocarpa DC.
 Sesbania pachycarpa DC.
 Sesbania rostrata Bremek. & Oberm.
 Sesbania sesban (L.) Merr.
 Sesbania sudanica J.B.Gillett
 Sesuvium hydaspicum (Edgew.) Gonç.
 Setaria barbata (Lam.) Kunth
 Setaria longiseta P.Beauv.
 Setaria pumila (Poir.) Roem. & Schult.
 Setaria sphacelata (Schumach.) Stapf & C.E.Hubb. ex M.B.Moss
 Setaria verticillata (L.) P.Beauv.
 Shirakiopsis elliptica (Hochst.) Esser
 Sida acuta Burm.f.
 Sida alba L.
 Sida cordifolia L.
 Sida javensis Cav.
 Sida linifolia Juss. ex Cav.
 Sida ovata Forssk.
 Sida rhombifolia L.
 Sida urens L.
 Siphonochilus aethiopicus (Schweinf.) B.L.Burtt
 Smeathmannia pubescens Sol. ex R.Br.
 Smilax anceps Willd.
 Solanum aculeatissimum Jacq.
 Solanum aethiopicum L.
 Solanum cerasiferum Dunal
 Solanum dasyphyllum Schumach. & Thonn.
 Solanum incanum L.
 Solanum melongena L.
 Solanum nigrum L.
 Solanum torvum Sw.
 Solanum tuberosum L.
 Solenostemon rotundifolius (Poir.) J.K.Morton
 Sonchus asper (L.) Hill
 Sonchus oleraceus L.
 Sopubia parviflora Engl.
 Sopubia ramosa (Hochst.) Hochst.
 Sopubia simplex (Hochst.) Hochst.
 Sorghastrum bipennatum (Hack.) Pilg.
 Sorghastrum stipoides (Kunth) Nash
 Sorghum arundinaceum (Desv.) Stapf
 Sorghum bicolor (L.) Moench
 Sorghum purpureo-sericeum (Hochst. ex A.Rich.) Asch. & Schweinf.
 Sorindeia juglandifolia (A.Rich.) Planch. ex Oliv.
 Spermacoce chaetocephala DC.
 Spermacoce filifolia (Schumach. & Thonn.) J.-P.Lebrun & Stork
 Spermacoce hepperana Verdc.
 Spermacoce octodon (Hepper) J.-P.Lebrun & Stork
 Spermacoce pusilla Wall.
 Spermacoce quadrisulcata (Bremek.) Verdc.
 Spermacoce radiata (DC.) Hiern
 Spermacoce ruelliae DC.
 Spermacoce spermacocina (K.Schum.) Bridson & Puff
 Spermacoce stachydea DC.
 Spermacoce verticillata L.
 Sphaeranthus angustifolius DC.
 Sphaeranthus senegalensis DC.
 Sphaerocodon caffrum (Meisn.) Schltr.
 Sphenoclea zeylanica Gaertn.
 Sphenostylis schweinfurthii Harms
 Sphenostylis stenocarpa (Hochst. ex A.Rich.) Harms
 Spigelia anthelmia L.
 Spondianthus preussii Engl.
 Spondias mombin L.
 Sporobolus festivus Hochst. ex A.Rich.
 Sporobolus helvolus (Trin.) T.Durand & Schinz
 Sporobolus microprotus Stapf
 Sporobolus paniculatus (Trin.) T.Durand & Schinz
 Sporobolus pectinellus Mez
 Sporobolus pellucidus Hochst.
 Sporobolus pilifer (Trin.) Kunth
 Sporobolus pyramidalis P.Beauv.
 Sporobolus sanguineus Rendle
 Sporobolus stolzii Mez
 Sporobolus subglobosus A.Chev.
 Stachytarpheta indica (L.) Vahl
 Stapfochloa lamproparia (Stapf) H.Scholz
 Steganotaenia araliacea Hochst.
 Stemodia serrata Benth.
 Stenotaphrum dimidiatum (L.) Brongn.
 Stenotaphrum secundatum (Walter) Kuntze
 Sterculia setigera Delile
 Sterculia tragacantha Lindl.
 Stereospermum kunthianum Cham.
 Stomatanthes africanus (Oliv. & Hiern) R.M.King & H.Rob.
 Striga asiatica (L.) Kuntze
 Striga aspera (Willd.) Benth.
 Striga baumannii Engl.
 Striga bilabiata (Thunb.) Kuntze
 Striga brachycalyx Engl. ex Skan
 Striga forbesii Benth.
 Striga gesnerioides (Willd.) Vatke
 Striga hermonthica (Delile) Benth.
 Striga klingii (Engl.) Skan
 Striga macrantha (Benth.) Benth.
 Striga passargei Engl.
 Strophanthus gratus (Wall. & Hook.) Baill.
 Strophanthus hispidus DC.
 Strophanthus sarmentosus DC.
 Struchium sparganophorum (L.) Kuntze
 Strychnos congolana Gilg
 Strychnos cuminodora Leeuwenberg
 Strychnos innocua Delile
 Strychnos spinosa Lam.
 Strychnos usambarensis Gilg
 Stylochaeton hypogaeus Lepr.
 Stylochaeton lancifolius Kotschy & Peyr.
 Stylosanthes erecta P.Beauv.
 Stylosanthes fruticosa (Retz.) Alston
 Stylosanthes guianensis (Aubl.) Sw.
 Stylosanthes hamata L.
 Synedrella nodiflora Gaertn.
 Synsepalum brevipes (Baker) T.D.Penn.
 Synsepalum pobeguinianum (Pierre ex Lecomte) Aké Assi & L.Gaut.
 Syzygium guineense (Willd.) DC.
 Tacazzea apiculata Oliv.
 Tacca leontopetaloides (L.) Kuntze
 Talinum triangulare (Jacq.) Willd.
 Tamarindus indica L.
 Tapinanthus bangwensis (Engl. & K.Krause) Danser
 Tapinanthus globiferus (A.Rich.) Tiegh.
 Tapinanthus ophiodes (Sprague) Danser
 Tarenna pavettoides (Harv.) Sim
 Tarenna thomasii Hutch. & Dalziel
 Tecoma stans (L.) Juss. ex Kunth
 Tectona grandis L.f.
 Telosma africana (N.E.Br.) N.E.Br.
 Tephrosia berhautiana Lescot
 Tephrosia bracteolata Guill. & Perr.
 Tephrosia deflexa Baker
 Tephrosia elegans Schumach.
 Tephrosia gracilipes Guill. & Perr.
 Tephrosia humilis Guill. & Perr.
 Tephrosia lathyroides Guill. & Perr.
 Tephrosia lebrunii Cronquist
 Tephrosia letestui Tisser.
 Tephrosia linearis (Willd.) Pers.
 Tephrosia lupinifolia DC.
 Tephrosia mossiensis A.Chev.
 Tephrosia nana Schweinf.
 Tephrosia pedicellata Baker
 Tephrosia platycarpa Guill. & Perr.
 Tephrosia purpurea (L.) Pers.
 Tephrosia sylviae Berhaut
 Tephrosia uniflora Pers.
 Tephrosia villosa (L.) Pers.
 Teramnus buettneri (Harms) Baker f.
 Teramnus labialis (L.f.) Spreng.
 Terminalia albida Scott-Elliot
 Terminalia avicennioides Guill. & Perr.
 Terminalia catappa L.
 Terminalia ivorensis A.Chev.
 Terminalia laxiflora Engl. & Diels
 Terminalia macroptera Guill. & Perr.
 Terminalia mantaly H.Perrier
 Terminalia mollis M.A.Lawson
 Terminalia schimperiana Hochst.
 Tetracera alnifolia Willd.
 Tetracera potatoria Afzel. ex G.Don
 Tetrapogon cenchriformis (A.Rich.) Clayton
 Thalia geniculata L.
 Thaumatococcus daniellii (Bennet) Benth.
 Thelepogon elegans Roth
 Thelypteris dentata (Forsk.) E. St. John
 Thelypteris striata (Schumach.) Schelpe
 Themeda triandra Forssk.
 Thesium viride A.W.Hill
 Thespesia populneoides (Roxb.) Kostel.
 Thonningia sanguinea Vahl
 Thunbergia erecta (Benth.) T.Anderson
 Tinnea aethiopica Kotschy ex Hook.f.
 Tinnea barteri Gürke
 Tinospora bakis (A.Rich.) Miers
 Trachypogon spicatus (L.f.) Kuntze
 Tragia senegalensis Müll.Arg.
 Tragia tenuifolia Benth.
 Tragia vogelii Keay
 Tragia volubilis L.
 Tragia wildemanii Beille
 Tragus berteronianus Schult.
 Tragus racemosus (L.) All.
 Trapa natans L.
 Trema orientalis (L.) Blume
 Trianthema portulacastrum L.
 Tribulus terrestris L.
 Tricalysia okelensis Hiern
 Trichilia emetica Vahl
 Trichoneura mollis (Kunth) Ekman
 Tricliceras pilosum (Willd.) R.Fern.
 Triclisia patens Oliv.
 Triclisia subcordata Oliv.
 Tridax procumbens L.
 Tripogon minimus (A.Rich.) Steud.
 Tristachya superba (De Not.) Schweinf. & Asch.
 Tristemma mauritianum J.F.Gmel.
 Tristicha trifaria (Bory ex Willd.) Spreng.
 Triumfetta lepidota K.Schum.
 Triumfetta pentandra A.Rich.
 Triumfetta rhomboidea Jacq.
 Triumfetta setulosa Mast.
 Trochomeria macrocarpa (Sond.) Hook.f.
 Tylophora oblonga N.E.Br.
 Tylophora oculata N.E.Br.
 Typha domingensis Pers.
 Uapaca heudelotii Baill.
 Uapaca togoensis Pax
 Uncaria africana G.Don
 Uncaria talbotii Wernham
 Uraria picta (Jacq.) DC.
 Urelytrum annuum Stapf
 Urelytrum muricatum C.E.Hubb.
 Urena lobata L.
 Urochloa brizantha (A.Rich.) Stapf
 Urochloa comata (Hochst. ex A.Rich.) Sosef
 Urochloa falcifera (Trin.) Stapf
 Urochloa jubata (Fig. & De Not.) Sosef
 Urochloa ruziziensis (R.Germ. & C.M.Evrard) Crins
 Urochloa trichopus (Hochst.) Stapf
 Usteria guineensis Willd.
 Utricularia arenaria A.DC.
 Utricularia foliosa L.
 Utricularia gibba L.
 Utricularia inflexa Forssk.
 Utricularia micropetala Sm.
 Utricularia pubescens Sm.
 Utricularia reflexa Oliv.
 Utricularia rigida Benj.
 Utricularia simulans Pilger
 Utricularia spiralis Sm.
 Utricularia stellaris L.f.
 Utricularia subulata L.
 Uvaria chamae P.Beauv.
 Vachellia ehrenbergiana Hayne
 Vachellia gerrardii Benth.
 Vachellia nilotica (L.) Willd. ex Delile
 Vachellia seyal Delile
 Vachellia sieberiana DC.
 Vachellia tortilis (Forssk.) Hayne
 Vahlia dichotoma (Murray) Kuntze
 Vahlia digyna (Retz.) Kuntze
 Vahlia geminiflora (Delile) Bridson
 Vangueriella spinosa (Schumach. & Thonn.) Verdc.
 Vepris heterophylla (Engl.) Letouzey
 Vernonia adoensis Sch.Bip. ex Walp.
 Vernonia ambigua Kotschy & Peyr.
 Vernonia amygdalina Delile
 Vernonia chapmanii C.D.Adams
 Vernonia chthonocephala O.Hoffm.
 Vernonia colorata (Willd.) Drake
 Vernonia galamensis (Cass.) Less.
 Vernonia gerberiformis Oliv. & Hiern
 Vernonia guineensis Benth.
 Vernonia perrottetii Sch.Bip. ex Walp.
 Vernonia plumbaginifolia Fenzl ex Oliv. & Hiern
 Vernonia pumila Kotschy & Peyr.
 Vernonia smithiana Less.
 Vernoniastrum camporum (A.Chev.) Isawumi
 Vetiveria fulvibarbis (Trin.) Stapf
 Vigna adenantha (G.Mey.) Maréchal & Mascherpa & Stainier
 Vigna filicaulis Hepper
 Vigna gracilis (Guill. & Perr.) Hook.f.
 Vigna heterophylla A.Rich.
 Vigna kirkii (Baker) J.B.Gillett
 Vigna luteola (Jacq.) Benth.
 Vigna parkeri Baker
 Vigna racemosa (G.Don) Hutch. & Dalziel
 Vigna radiata (L.) R.Wilczek
 Vigna reticulata Hook.f.
 Vigna stenophylla Harms
 Vigna subterranea (L.) Verdc.
 Vigna unguiculata (L.) Walp.
 Vigna venulosa Baker
 Vigna vexillata (L.) A.Rich.
 Virectaria multiflora (Sm.) Bremek.
 Vismia guineensis (L.) Choisy
 Vitellaria paradoxa C.F.Gaertn.
 Vitex chrysocarpa Planch. ex Benth.
 Vitex doniana Sweet
 Vitex madiensis Oliv.
 Voacanga africana Stapf
 Voacanga thouarsii Roem. & Schult.
 Vossia cuspidata (Roxb.) Griff.
 Wahlenbergia hirsuta (Edgew.) Tuyn
 Wahlenbergia lobelioides (L.f.) Link
 Wahlenbergia perrottetii (A.DC.) Thulin
 Waltheria indica L.
 Waltheria lanceolata R.Br. ex Mast.
 Warneckea fascicularis (Planch. ex Benth.) Jacq.-Fél.
 Wissadula rostrata (Schumach.) Hook.f.
 Xanthosoma sagittifolium (L.) Schott
 Xeroderris stuhlmannii (Taub.) Mendonça & E.C.Sousa
 Ximenia americana L.
 Xylopia acutiflora (Dunal) A.Rich.
 Xylopia aethiopica (Dunal) A.Rich.
 Xylopia elliotii Engl. & Diels
 Xyris barteri N.E.Br.
 Xyris decipiens N.E.Br.
 Xyris straminea L.A.Nilsson
 Xysmalobium heudelotianum Decne.
 Zaleya pentandra (L.) C.Jeffrey
 Zanha golungensis Hiern
 Zanthoxylum leprieurii Guill. & Perr.
 Zanthoxylum zanthoxyloides (Lam.) Zepern. & Timler
 Zea mays L.
 Zehneria capillacea (Schumach.) C.Jeffrey
 Zehneria hallii C.Jeffrey
 Zehneria scabra (L.f.) Sond.
 Zehneria thwaitesii (Schweinf.) C.Jeffrey
 Ziziphus abyssinica A.Rich.
 Ziziphus lotus (L.) Lam.
 Ziziphus mauritiana Lam.
 Ziziphus mucronata Willd.
 Ziziphus spina-christi (L.) Desf.
 Zornia durumuensis De Wild.
 Zornia glochidiata Rchb. ex DC.
 Zoysia matrella (L.) Merr.
 Zoysia tenuifolia Willd. ex Thiele
 Zygotritonia crocea Stapf

See also
 Wildlife of Burkina Faso

References

 
Burkina Faso